Davenport Glacier is located in a cirque to the southeast of Boston Peak, North Cascades National Park in the U.S. state of Washington. The glacier is also northeast of Sahale Mountain and separated from the much larger Boston Glacier to the north by an arête called "Ripsaw Ridge".

See also
List of glaciers in the United States

References

Glaciers of the North Cascades
Glaciers of Chelan County, Washington
Glaciers of Washington (state)